Miroculis is a genus of pronggill mayflies in the family Leptophlebiidae. There are more than 20 described species in Miroculis.

Species
These 22 species belong to the genus Miroculis:

 Miroculis amazonicus Savage & Peters, 1983
 Miroculis bicoloratus Savage, 1987
 Miroculis brasiliensis Savage & Peters, 1983
 Miroculis caparaoensis Salles & Lima, 2011
 Miroculis chiribiquete Peters, Domínguez & Dereser, 2008
 Miroculis cohnhafti Boldrini, 2017
 Miroculis colombiensis Savage & Peters, 1983
 Miroculis duckensis Savage & Peters, 1983
 Miroculis eldorado Gama-Neto & Hamada, 2014
 Miroculis fazzariensis
 Miroculis fittkaui Savage & Peters, 1983
 Miroculis froehlichi Savage & Peters, 1983
 Miroculis marauiae Savage & Peters, 1983
 Miroculis mocidade Boldrini, 2017
 Miroculis mourei Savage & Peters, 1983
 Miroculis nebulosus Savage, 1987
 Miroculis rossi Edmunds, 1963
 Miroculis stenopterus
 Miroculis tepequensis
 Miroculis wandae Savage & Peters, 1983
 Miroculis xavieri Boldrini, 2017
 Miroculis yulieae Raimundi, Cabette, Brasil & Salles, 2017

References

Further reading

 
 

Mayflies
Articles created by Qbugbot
Mayfly genera